Swansea Marina is a marina located behind the Swansea barrage at the mouth of the River Tawe in Swansea, south Wales.  Swansea Marina was first awarded blue flag status in June 2005. There is a boat yard for building and servicing boats, and a few shops selling boating equipment.

History
After many years of industrial decline in the Lower Swansea valley, the South Dock of the Swansea Docks complex finally closed in 1969 leaving the area as an industrial wasteland. It was sold to the council. Initially, a new relief road was proposed to take traffic away from the Oystermouth road. However, there was a government reorganisation in 1974 which decided on a new planning strategy. By 1975, a new planning strategy had been prepared which identified social and economic policy objectives with a new regeneration programme.

It took a further 5 years for land acquisition, clearance and infrastructure installation before redevelopment could commence.  New sea defence works were installed, the dock basin had to be cleared of debris and new moorings needed to be installed for the new marina. More efficient modern lock gates were fitted, along with a new swing bridge and the quay sides were paved to create a new public walkway around the dockside.

The yacht marina was opened in 1982 providing berths for 385 boats. It was not until 1992 that the Swansea barrage was completed, transforming the River Tawe into long lake. Additional berths were constructed behind the barrage, just outside the marina proper, providing berthing for an additional 200 boats. A lock was incorporated into the barrage design to allow the passage of boats between the River Tawe system and the sea.

References

External links
Swansea Marina
An interactive, social networking and tourism web site based on the Gower Peninsula.

Transport in Swansea
Marinas in Wales
Buildings and structures in Swansea
Swansea Bay
Tourist attractions in Swansea